The British Columbia Democratic Coalition (BCDC) was a short-lived coalition of minor political parties in British Columbia, Canada.   It was founded in September 2004 to bring together four minor parties: the British Columbia Democratic Alliance, the British Columbia Moderate Democratic Movement, the Citizens Action Party and Link BC. The British Columbia Labour Party joined shortly thereafter.

On October 19, 2004, Link BC and CAP left the coalition, citing concerns that the group was too-closely associated with Gordon Wilson.  They vowed to merge under the Link BC name. 

The BCDC entered negotiations with Reform BC to merge and the two jointly nominated Shirley Abraham in the Surrey-Panorama Ridge byelection, who ran under the Reform Banner.

On January 15, 2005, the coalition merged with the All Nations Party of British Columbia into a new party called Democratic Reform British Columbia.  Reform BC did not join the new party, however many of its prominent members, including the party president and much of its board, left Reform BC to join the new party.

References
Democratic Reform BC
elections BC

Political party alliances in Canada
Democratic Coalition
Democratic Coalition
Democratic Coalition
Political parties established in 2004
Political parties disestablished in 2005